Harsh Ramesh Sanghvi (born 8 January 1985) is currently Home Minister (state). In the Gujarat CM Bhupendrabhai Patel’s cabinet, Sanghavi has been allocated nine portfolios which are Home, disaster management and police housing; MoS in sports, youth and cultural activities, NRI, excise and prohibition, border security and prisons. Before sanghvi Pradip Singh Jadeja, Amit Shah, Haren Pandya and Gordhanbhai Zadafia have served as the home minister of Gujarat under the BJP regime. He is a member of Gujarat Legislative Assembly, Majura in Gujarat, India. He was also National Vice President of Bhartiya Janta Yuva Morcha.

Early life 
Sanghvi was born in Surat on 8 January 1985. He came from a Gujarati family who were Jains. Ramesh bhuralal Sanghavi (father) was the Diamond Merchant of Surat. He was among the youth who hosted our national flag in kashmir, lal chowk. He then worked in a civic hospital. Later, he joined Yuva Morcha, the youth cell of BJP. He was appointed the youngest general secretary of state for the BJP.  In the past, Sanghavi has also worked with Anurag Thakur, now the Minister of Information & Broadcasting, and MP Poonam Mahajan.

seat by a record-breaking margin and was the 4th highest winner of Gujarat Assembly.  In 2013, Harsh was reappointed youth BJP state Vice President. In 2017, he was appointed National Vice President of Bharatiya Janata Yuva Morcha. On 18 September 2021, he became Home Minister of Gujarat and assumed office as Home (MOS), disaster management and police housing; MoS in sports, youth and cultural activities, NRI, excise and prohibition, border security and prisons.

Social Work
On 28 June 2015, Harsh Sanghavi with 400 volunteers associated with the movement gathered at Navdi Ovara on the bank of river Tapi in Nanpura for cleaning it. The young volunteers who came with banners and brooms, stepped into thick muck on the river bank to remove plastic and waste. Wearing T-shirts with a message of 'Clean Tapi - Clean India', the participants carried out the cleaning work with a city-based rock band 'Antrikh' playing live music. Harsh belongs to visa shrimali baniya community.

During August, 2020 he tested positive for COVID-19.

During COVID-19 pandemic :-

1) he was among the first mla to start 200 bed oxygen supported hospital.

2)Under his inspiration lakhs of people in need including migrants were provided food with support of SMC and surat officers Gymkhana.

3)He along with his team had initiated delivering food, medicines etc. to elderly at their home.

Highlights from the Majura Election 2022 
Harsh Ramesh Sanghavi, a BJP candidate, won the Majura Assembly constituency in Gujarat (December 8 2022). The counting of ballots for the Majura assembly seat is already complete. Majura was one of the most competitive constituencies in the Gujarat Assembly Elections 2022, with state home minister Harsh Sanghavi running as a Bharatiya Janata Party (BJP) candidate.

Sanghavi beat Congress candidate Ashok Mohanlal Kothari by a significant margin of over 85 thousand votes in the 2017 elections. Majura assembly seat is part of the Navsari Lok Sabha constituency. PVS Sarma of the Aam Aadmi Party (AAP) has been nominated to contest Sanghavi on the Majura seat, while Balwant Shatilal Jain of the Congress has been nominated.

References

External links 
 Harsh Sanghvi's profile on ourneta.com
 
 
 Austria India Youth Dialog
 
 

1985 births
Living people
Gujarat MLAs 2012–2017
Gujarat MLAs 2017–2022
People from Surat
Bharatiya Janata Party politicians from Gujarat